The Jaceruba Environmental Protection Area (formerly the Rio São Pedro de Jaceruba Environmental Protection Area) is a municipal environmental protection area in the state of Rio de Janeiro, Brazil.

Location

The Jaceruba Environmental Protection Area (APA Jaceruba) is in the northwest of the municipality of Nova Iguaçu, Rio de Janeiro, on the border with the municipalities of Miguel Pereira and Japeri.
It is in an inaccessible region adjoining the Tinguá Biological Reserve to the east.
It is accessed by RJ-119, a dirt road in poor condition.
The APA contains remnants of Atlantic Forest.
Threats include deforestation, burning and irregular occupation.

History

Before the APA was created the area was used for hunting, capture of wild animals for sale and extraction of hearts of palm.
Restaurants by the roadside freely advertised the sale of bush meat.
The area was also under pressure from real estate speculators due to the expansion of the metropolitan arc of Rio de Janeiro.

The Rio São Pedro de Jaceruba Environmental Protection Area was created by municipal decree 6.492 of 6 June 2002.
On 5 November 2002 by municipal decree 6.547 it was renamed the APA Jaceruba (Jaceruba Environmental Protection Area).

The APA is part of the Central Rio de Janeiro Atlantic Forest Mosaic, created in 2006.
On 20 January 2010 Maria Emilia Nascimento wrote to Carlos Minc, federal Minister of the Environment, asking for help in ensuring the safety of representatives of the APA on the council of the mosaic. They had been suffering from threats and attacks in the isolated APA.

Notes

Sources

 

Environmental protection areas of Brazil
Protected areas of Rio de Janeiro (state)
2002 establishments in Brazil